Club Atlético Espeleño is a Spanish football team based in Espiel, Córdoba, in the autonomous community of Andalusia. Founded in 1982, it plays in División Honor, holding home matches at Campo Municipal de Espiel, with a capacity of 1,000 people.

Season to season

3 seasons in Tercera División

References

External links
La Preferente profile 
Fútbol Regional profile 

Football clubs in Andalusia
Association football clubs established in 1982
1982 establishments in Spain